Waddow Hall is a 17th-century Grade II listed building within a  estate that serves as a conference and activity centre for Girlguiding UK near Clitheroe, Lancashire. Waddow Hall has been managed by Girlguiding since 1927.

History 
The Waddow estate and the Parish of Waddington were managed by Roger de Tempest of Bracewell, Lord of Waddington in 1267. Waddow Hall was built by the Tempest family during the Tudor period, and the estate and lands remained in the Tempest family until 1657, when Richard Tempest died in a debtors' prison.

Following Richard Tempest's death in prison, the land and buildings of the Waddow estate were acquired in 1658 by Christopher Wilkinson of Clitheroe, an out-bailiff and later a member of parliament. Wilkinson bequeathed the estate and buildings to his nephew John Weddell of Widdington in 1693 (rather than to his own son whom he suspected of popery) and the property remained in the Weddell family until 1778, when Thomas Weddell bequeathed them to Sir John Ramsden.

Waddow remained in the Ramsden family until the mid-1800s, when it was sold to William Garnett by Sir John Ramsden, 5th Baronet. The Girl Guides Association rented the Estate between 1927 and 1928, using it as an activity centre, and purchased it for £9,000 from William Garnett's son on 16 October 1928.

During the Second World War the estate was lent to Lancashire County Council, and served as an isolation hospital for children.

Haunting 
According to local folklore the estate is haunted by the ghost of Peg O'Nell, a former servant at the hall, who was murdered by the lady of the house. The legend suggests that Peg O'Nell was sent to fetch water from a well, when the mistress pushed her, causing her to fall in the well and die. Peg O'Nell was rumoured to be with child whose father was the Husband of the mistress. .

In November 2004 the British paranormal reality television show Most Haunted broadcast an episode from Waddow Hall.

See also

Listed buildings in Waddington, Lancashire

References

External links 
 Waddow page from Girlguiding UK Conference and Activity Centres

Buildings and structures in Ribble Valley
Country houses in Lancashire
Grade II listed buildings in Lancashire
Girlguiding